Jalalabad (also Romanized as Jalālābād; also known as Jalīlābād and Khalīlābād) is a village in Sharifabad Rural District, in the Central District of Sirjan County, Kerman Province, Iran. At the 2006 census, its population was 318, in 74 families.

References 

Populated places in Sirjan County